SRC (Street Records Corporation) was an American record label created by former Loud Records CEO Steve Rifkind.  It was a subsidiary of Universal Music Group and was distributed through Republic Records.

Company history
SRC was founded by Steve Rifkind in 2001. In 2002, he was ousted from his CEO position from Loud. Although he already had SRC, he made it a bigger priority and sign an exclusive distribution deal with Universal. The label was much like Loud Records, a hip hop and R&B label. The first move with the label was signing David Banner, a rapper from Jackson, Mississippi. With Banner as their flagship artist, SRC soared to great heights behind his 2003 debut. The label was instantly hailed as the second-coming of Interscope Records, due to the obvious similarities. The hit single "Like A Pimp," would make the label a household name within the hip hop community. During the year of 2003, the label would hit paydirt after hearing tapes from Senegalese singer, Akon, who they would immediately sign to their label. In 2004, Akon would release his multi-platinum debut album, Trouble. In early 2004, they signed a deal to distribute material from the rap supergroup, Terror Squad. SRC would go on to release all albums from Remy Ma and the group Terror Squad, itself. In the summer of 2004, SRC would become home to the hit single, "Lean Back," by Fat Joe and Remy Ma. After these releases, SRC had established itself among the other heavyweight record labels in hip hop music. In 2005, the label granted Akon his own label Konvict Muzik. The deal brought more artists on to the label and a hit album from Akon.

Loud deal and later successes 
In June 2007, Sony Music resurrected Rifkind's original label, Loud Records. Loud had been home to many of the more popular hip hop acts of the time, but would shut down operations in 2004. After the resurrection of Loud, Rifkind would buy the label and make it a subsidiary of SRC. His first act after re-gaining the label was, as he did fifteen years earlier, signing the Wu-Tang Clan. In August 2010 Rifkind signed rapper Joell Ortiz in a deal with SRC Records and Universal Motown Records. The label had a deal with Universal Republic Records, later the label was reverted to Republic Records.

On July 29, 2012, Steve Rifkind announced that he was leaving Universal Music Group on September 1, 2012.

Labels under SRC
 Terror Squad Entertainment (before 2007)
 Loud Records
 UpFront Records
 Konvict Muzik

Roster
 David Banner
 Shontelle
 Melanie Fiona
 Ray J
 Aubrey O'Day
 DJ Webstar
 Majic Massey
 Xzibit
 Prodigy

SRC discography
 David Banner – Mississippi: The Album (2003)
 Baby Bash – Tha Smokin' Nephew (2003)
 David Banner – MTA2: Baptized in Dirty Water (2003)
 Akon – Trouble (2004)
 Terror Squad – True Story (2004)
 Ric A Che- Lack of Communication (2004)
 Baby Bash – Super Saucy (2005)
 David Banner – Certified (2005)
 Remy Ma – There's Something About Remy (2006)
 Akon – Konvicted (2006)
 Pharoahe Monch – Desire (2007)
 Grandaddy Souf – Chasing My Dream (2007)
 Keith Sweat – The Sweat Hotel (2007)
 Wu-Tang Clan – 8 Diagrams (2007)
 Lil' Baza Featuring DJ Gayness (2008)
 David Banner – The Greatest Story Ever Told(2008)
 Shontelle – Shontelligence (2008)
 Akon – Freedom (2008)
 Lala Man – September (2008)
 Heavy Mojo – Blow Out The Sound (2009)
 Asher Roth – Asleep in the Bread Aisle (2009)
 Melanie Fiona – The Bridge (2009)
 Shontelle - No Gravity (2010)
 Melanie Fiona - The MF Life (2012)

See also
 List of record labels
 List of SRC artists

References

External links
 Official SRC Records website

 
Defunct record labels of the United States
Hip hop record labels
New York (state) record labels
 
Record labels established in 2002
Record labels disestablished in 2012
2002 establishments in New York (state)
Labels distributed by Universal Music Group